Guandan is a game of poker that originated in Jiangsu province, China. The game uses two decks of cards (including the Jokers) and is played with four players. Players that sit across from one another form a team of two. The basic rule of the game is to put down larger cards to beat the opposing team until all the cards are thrown in. The first to put in all their cards will win the game. In Guandan, a team's score is expressed as the Level. there are 13 levels in total, corresponding to the card ranks from 2 up to A (2, 3, 4, 5, 6, 7, 8, 9, 10, J, Q, K, A). In a Game-based tournament, a team only wins the game if it wins on Level A.

History 
Guandan was invented in Huai'an, Jiangsu in the 1960s. Therefore it is also called Huai'an Running Fast, and has spread to neighboring cities of Huai'an such as Nanjing in the 1990s. It is estimated that there are over 20 million people who play this game in Jiangsu and Anhui province. Moreover, certain television channels have specific TV programs for Guandan and certain websites contain online Guandan games.

Rules

Cards and Player Setting 
Guandan is played by four players, who will sit around a square table. The two people who sit opposite to each other will form a team to beat the team formed by the other two. In other words, for a certain player, the two people who sit beside the player will be the player's opponents in this game.

Guandan uses two decks of standard international cards of 108 cards as a total. Therefore, each player will have 27 cards in each

Card Scores and Types 
There are four suits of card types in Guandan: Spades, Hearts, Diamonds, and Clubs with each suit containing 26 cards(2-10, J, Q, K, A, 2 for each). Besides, there are four jokers, two red and two black.

Types

Single card 
The single card represents any certain card in the deck

Pair 
Pair represents a combination of two cards of the same number. A pair can be two cards with different suits, but a black joker and a red joker cannot be a pair.

Triple 
Triple represents a combination of three cards of the same number.

Plate 
The plate represents a combination of two consecutive triples. For example, a triple of 4 and a triple of 5 form a plate.

Tube 
The tube represents a combination of three consecutive pairs. For example, a pair of 10, a pair of J and a pair of Q form a tube.

Full House 
The full house represents a combination of a triple and a pair.

Straight 
Straight represents a combination of five consecutive single cards. For example, a single card of A, a single card of 2, a single card of 3, a single card of 4, and a single card of 5 forms a straight.

Bomb 
Bomb represents a combination of cards with the same number. The number of cards should be no fewer than 4. For example, six single cards of 8 form a bomb.

Straight Flush 
Straight flush represents a straight with all of the single cards of the same suit.

Joker Bomb 
Joker Bomb represents a combination of all the four jokers. It is regarded as the largest bomb in the game.

Level Cards and Wild Cards

Level Cards 
For each round, the winners will level up the team's rank starting from 2. Also, the level number they are up to will be the number of the level cards for the next round. The level cards in the particular round must be smaller than jokers but larger than the other cards. Moreover, any combination with level cards are also becoming larger than that with other cards according to the comparison rule mentioned later.

Wild cards 
Wild cards are the two-level cards in Heart in the particular round. In the round, it can be regarded as any of the cards except jokers to combine other cards to form types of cards. But it will be regarded as the normal level card as a single card. For example, when the level card is 7 in the round, hearts of 7 can be regarded as a 4-bomb of 8 when combined with a triple of 8.

Comparison 

 The normal comparison of the cards is from high to low in the order of red joker, black joker, A, K, Q, J, 10, 9, 8, 7, 6, 5, 4, 3, 2, (A). it works when comparing with a single card, pair, triple, tube,  plate, straight bomb, and straight flush. Specially, full house compares the triple in the combination only.
 Bomb depends on its number of cards. The smallest is 4-bomb of 2 and the largest is 8-bomb of A. However, for instance, a 5-bomb of 2 is larger than the 4-bomb of A. Bomb is larger than any following types: single card, pair, triple, tube,  plate, full house, straight. A straight flush is regarded as a bomb as well. It is larger than any bomb with a number of no more than 5. Bomb with more than 5 cards is larger than any straight flush. Straight flushes compare whose original straight is larger regardless of suits. Joker bomb is the largest bomb in the game.

Glossary

Playing Guandan

Preparation 
For the first round, after shuffling the decks and placed facing down as a pile on the table, one of the players randomly cuts the pile into two small piles and then draws a card to flip it faced up. If it is not a joker, the players will decide who is going to draw cards at first by counting counterclockwise from the player who draws the first card from the top of the pile. The player who draws the last card will open the play.

Playing 
Players will play cards in counterclockwise order. The first player can throw any type of cards in his or her hand. Then the others will choose to throw cards of the same type or a bomb. Otherwise, the players should say "Pass" and not throw any cards. If the other three players say "Pass" for the cards one player throws, he or she can continue throwing any other types of cards. The first one to finish throwing all 27 cards is called the Banker, and the game continues until all three players finish completely. The second is called the Follower, the third is called the Third and the last is called the Dweller. If a team contains the Banker and the Follower, then the opponent team is called the Double-Dweller.

Reporting 
If a player only has ten or fewer than ten cards in his or her hands, he or she must declare how many cards in the hands.

Leveling Up 
A team will level up when the Banker is in it. There are in total 12 levels to level up from 2 up to A. The team with the Banker could level up by three levels if the other one is the Follower. If the other one is the Third, two levels will be up and if the other one is the Dweller, only one level will be up.

Winning Conditions 
In the whole game, a team can win the game if it wins at the A level and the team cannot have the Dweller.

References 

Chinese card games
Poker variants